TeleTicino (styled in lower case as teleticino) is an Italian-language television channel based in Melide, Switzerland. It was established in 1987.

The channel provides local news and entertainment programming for the Ticino canton, which has a mostly Italian-speaking population. Its programming includes talk shows, political debates, comedies in the local Ticinese dialect, entertainment, and sports.

The channel is majority-owned by Timedia Holding SA, which also owns Corriere del Ticino, a local newspaper. Though it is privately owned, it receives public subsidies from television licence fees.

References

External links
 Official website

Television stations in Switzerland
Television channels and stations established in 1987
Italian-language television stations